Christian Murray is a Canadian actor and writer.  He has written for This Hour Has 22 Minutes, Talking to Americans and Daily Tips for Modern Living, and wrote the play Bone Boy which he directed in Halifax in 2012.

He lives in Halifax, Nova Scotia with his partner Mary-Colin Chisholm and their daughter Emlyn.

Awards
 Canadian Comedy Award, 2001 and 2002, for This Hour Has 22 Minutes
 Gemini Award, "Best Writing in a Comedy or Variety Program or Series", 2000, for This Hour Has 22 Minutes

References

External links

20th-century Canadian male actors
20th-century Canadian male writers
20th-century Canadian screenwriters
21st-century Canadian male actors
21st-century Canadian male writers
21st-century Canadian screenwriters
21st-century Canadian dramatists and playwrights
Canadian comedy writers
Canadian male screenwriters
Canadian male television actors
Canadian male film actors
Canadian male stage actors
Canadian male dramatists and playwrights
Canadian television writers
Canadian theatre directors
Male actors from Halifax, Nova Scotia
Writers from Halifax, Nova Scotia
Living people
Year of birth missing (living people)
Canadian Comedy Award winners